Edina Knapek (born 5 October 1977) is a Hungarian foil fencer, bronze medallist at the 2002 and 2005 World Championships, and team gold medallist at the 2007 European Championships. She competed in the women's individual and team foil events at the 2000 and 2008 Summer Olympics.

References

External links
 
 Profile at the European Fencing Confederation

1977 births
Living people
Hungarian female foil fencers
Olympic fencers of Hungary
Fencers at the 2000 Summer Olympics
Fencers at the 2008 Summer Olympics
Fencers at the 2016 Summer Olympics
Martial artists from Budapest
21st-century Hungarian women